Events in the year 1937 in China.

Incumbents 
President: Lin Sen
Premier: Chiang Kai-shek
Vice Premier: Kung Hsiang-hsi
Foreign Minister: Zhang Qun until March 4, then Wang Ch'ung-hui

Events

January 
 January 14 – Wang Jingwei took a German passenger boat to Shanghai.
 January 19 – Hunan University was changed to National Hunan University, and the Ministry of Education appointed Pi Zongshi as the principal.
 January 28 – Manuel L. Quezon, President of the Philippines, arrived in Shanghai and departed the next day.

July to December 
 7–9 July – Marco Polo Bridge Incident
 early July-early August – Battle of Beiping–Tianjin
 August – Operation Chahar
 August–December – Beiping–Hankou Railway Operation
 August–November – Tianjin–Pukou Railway Operation
 13 August – 26 November – Battle of Shanghai
 1 September – 9 November – Battle of Taiyuan
 13 September – 11 November – Battle of Xinkou
 24 September – 25 September – Battle of Pingxingguan
 26 October- 1 November – Defense of Sihang Warehouse

Births 
Han Dingxiang
Liu Caipin
Zhou Chaochen
Yu Xiaosong

Deaths 
January 8 – Pamela Werner
July 28 – Zhao Dengyu, Tong Linge
October 15 – Hao Mengling
November 21 – Gao Zhihang
December 1 – Rao Guohua
December 25 – Xiong Xiling

See also 
 List of Chinese films of the 1930s

References 

 
1930s in China
Years of the 20th century in China